Brandon Taylor Anscombe Chebby is an English-born Burundian footballer who plays as a forward for Folland Sports. He is also a full international for Burundi.

Club career
Chebby played for National League side Eastleigh at youth level. In December 2019, it was announced he would be joining Burundi Premier League side Aigle Noir Makamba. Ahead of the 2020–21 season, he had returned to England to play for Wessex League side Hamble Club, making his league debut as a substitute in a 2–1 loss to Tadley Calleva. In April 2021, he joined AFC Portchester to play for the club's under-23 side. In November 2021, he was playing for Wessex League Division One side  Folland Sports.

International career
Chebby three appearances for Burundi in the 2020 Bangabandhu Cup. In May 2021, he was called up to the Burundi U23 side for their 2021 CECAFA U-23 Challenge Cup campaign.

References

Living people
2000 births
Association football forwards
Footballers from Southampton
Burundian footballers
Burundi international footballers
English footballers
English people of Burundian descent
Burundi Premier League players
Hamble Club F.C. players
Folland Sports F.C. players
Wessex Football League players